Muncie is a city in Indiana, United States.

Muncie may also refer to:
Muncie, Illinois, a village
Muncie, Kansas, a neighborhood

People with the surname
Chuck Muncie, American football player

See also
Muncey, surname
Muncy (disambiguation)
Munsee (disambiguation)
Munsey (disambiguation)